Toft is a small village in the South Kesteven district of Lincolnshire, England. Toft is part of the civil parish of Toft with Lound and Manthorpe. The population of the civil parish at the 2011 census was 333.

This was the only tunnel on that railway, which ran for the most part over the Fens. The tunnel is actually in Lound, though still in the parish. It is now managed as a nature reserve

Toft Hotel Golf Course is on the southern edge of the village. The East Glen river flows through the village, also to the south.

The north of the parish includes the deserted medieval village of Bowthorpe, now a single farm, which gives its name to the Bowthorpe Oak.

References

External links

Villages in Lincolnshire
South Kesteven District